Paranapanema is a municipality in the state of São Paulo in Brazil. The population was estimated at 20,395 in 2020, in an area of 1019 km². The elevation is 610 m.

References

Municipalities in São Paulo (state)